The Balkan Botanic Garden of Kroussia (BBGK), was funded in the framework of the Inter-Regional Developmental Initiatives of the European Union (INTERREG II-External Borders). It was founded on May 19th, 2001 as an initiative of the Hellenic Agricultural Organization "Demeter". It is member of the Botanic Gardens Conservation International (BGCI) and National Network of Hellenic Botanic Gardens. The research and services of BBGK are supported by the Laboratory of Protection and Exploitation of Native and Floricultural Plants located at Thermi of Thessaloniki.

Location

BBGK is situated in northern Greece, about 70 km from Thessaloniki, near the mountain village of Pontokerasia in the Prefecture of Kilkis (41°05ʹN/23°06ʹE). It is located close to the borderlines of Greece, North Macedonia and Bulgaria, lying between two important conservation areas included in the Natura 2000 Network, Lake Kerkini and surrounding mountains (GR1260001: Limni Kerkini-Krousia-Koryfes orous beles, Agistro-Charopo) and the Mouries hydrophilous lake forest (GR1230002: Ydrochares Dasos Mourion).

Aim and Use

The BBGK has been developed within a deciduous oak forest (Quercus pubescens and Q. frainetto) that has been traditionally managed for a long time, at an altitude of 600m (Mount Mavrovouni, Kroussa Mountain Range). Today it covers an area of 31ha which is dedicated to the combined ex situ and in situ conservation of native plants of Greece and the Balkans (15ha and 16ha, respectively), as well as to raising the environmental awareness of, and educating, the public.

It hosts exclusively indigenous plant species and subspecies of Greece, which correspond to islands, rugged mountain peaks, forests, to rocky slopes and meadows, valleys, to beaches or riverbanks and lakes of the territory.

The visitors can walk through the periodic and permanent exhibition area, enjoy the open and close kiosks for resting, admire the view from the birdwatching areas and have a picnic. There is an entrance fee for the guided tour as much as a small shop with products from the Garden. BBGK is open all year round for visitors and on demand (mail or call) for guided tours and events.

Moreover, visitors can make a guided tour on the various thematic paths where the plants are organized into various modules that serve scientific, research and educational purposes.The BBGK is composed of two basic areas, the Garden of the Senses and the main Conservation Area. Almost half of the BBGK’s territory is a natural oak forest and at least 300 wild growing plant taxa (species and subspecies) thrive there and their populations are being conserved along with their habitats (in situ conservation).

The BBGK is open for visitors throughout the year. Since its establishment in 2001, there has been a continuous increase in visitor numbers and to date the BBGK receives about 10,000 visitors per year, of which 40% are schoolchildren, students or teachers.

The Curator is Dr. Eleni Maloupa.

Symbolic Plant
The BBGK’s symbol-plant is Fritillaria pontica due to the wild populations discovered in the grounds of BBGK. This plant has been adopted as a symbol for its recognized ornamental value, its restricted general distribution area (Balkan countries and northern Turkey), its uncommon occurrence in Greece and its protection by the Greek Presidential Decree 67/81; these are properties that may illustrate the targets and policies of the BBGK.

The policy of the Balkan Botanic Garden of Kroussia and current outcomes

The Balkan Botanic Garden of Kroussia (BBGK) has formulated a clear conservation strategy with specific policies  and has adopted the mission to “support research, maintenance, propagation, evaluation, conservation and sustainable use of the native plants of Greece and the Balkans, combined with raising the environmental awareness of the public”.

The BBGK has been focused on the conservation and the sustainable use of the native plants of Greece and the Balkans (‘Only native plants’ policy), leaving aside exotic ornamental plants. In this way, all plant displays in BBGK (n=40) have been created using plant material originating in the wild that has been sustainably managed and put through a ‘domestication procedure’ in the man-made environment of the botanic gardens. 
In the first place, all plant material is collected with the use of special permit from the Greek Ministry of Environment and Energy which is issued upon request on an annual basis and reports are given back to the national authorities regarding the plant material collected and maintained. Prior to collections in the wild, the regional forest agencies are informed and they report back to the Greek ministry. With this permit, the BBGK’s scientific staff is able to collect plant material for ex situ conservation from threatened or common species, even from protected areas, Natura 2000 sites and nature reserves. All mother plant material is associated with explicit information regarding its collection in the wild i.e. geographical coordinates and site description (specific location, region, prefecture and country). No accession number is given to plant collections with poor documentation. Habitat information is also documented in situ for each individual accession collected (substrate, soil type, forest zone, habitat type, slope, altitude). Additionally, in many cases GIS are used to unveil the natural species-specific ecological preferences of conservation priority plants. This procedure represents the BBGK’s ‘explicit plant documentation’ policy.

To document the genetic identity of different accession numbers and to facilitate identification of the uniqueness of specimens, possible sustainable exploitation of selected accessions, accurate plant documentation, traceability, access and benefit sharing policies, the ‘DNA barcoding policy’ is applied with selected molecular markers. 
To date, >130 plant collecting expeditions have been organized in all phytogeographical regional of Greece and >2,800 accessions of propagation material (seeds, bulbs, rhizomes, cuttings, living individuals) have been collected from the wild. This corresponds to 1,200 taxa (> 20% of the Greek flora). 
Not the entire Greek and Balkan native flora is a key priority of BBGK; taking into account the international agenda of botanic gardens in conservation (Wyse-Jackson & Sutherland, 2000), five principal plant categories have been proritised for action [‘Important Plant Species (IPS)’ policy]; these are:
(1) Greek endemic plants (range-restricted) such as single-island or single-mountain or single-area endemics and Greek regional (restricted to few phytogeographical regions of Greece) or national endemics (restricted to several regions of Greece),
(2) Balkan endemics of narrow distribution (range-restricted), including native plants occurring around the boundaries of Greece with neighbouring Balkan countries and/or Turkey,
(3) Balkan (sub-) endemics, including taxa found exclusively in the Balkan countries and/or extending to western Turkey and/or parts of Italy, 
(4) Other rare plant taxa found in Greece, including native plant species of wider distribution than (i), (ii) or (iv), with one or only a few scattered and/or isolated populations nationally,
(5) Plants with aromatic-medicinal properties, agroalimentary interest, ornamental-floricultural or breeding potential (e.g. crop wild relatives), or socioeconomic value (‘Evaluation for sustainable exploitation’ policy).

The BBGK prioritises the propagation and ex situ conservation of the important plant species (‘IPS first’ policy) and several species-specific propagation protocols have been produced.

During the last 15 years, about 150 Greek endemics have been successfully propagated (Krigas et al. 2016), but progressively during the last years efforts have been intensified and >300 taxa (20% of all Greek endemics) are currently found under ex situ conservation.
Any plant material shared with other institutions for research purposes or stakeholders is provided with a Material Transfer Agreement and passport data with International Plant Exchange Network (IPEN) numbering and comply to the EU Regulation 511/2014 implementing the Nagoya Protocol and the Greek National Law 4617, Issue A’ 88/10.6.2019 (‘Access and benefit sharing’ policy).

See also

Botanic Gardens Conservation International

Kilkis

References

Botanical gardens